The Institute of International Finance (IIF) is the association or trade group for the global financial services industry. It was created by 38 banks of leading industrialized countries in 1983 in response to the international debt crisis of the early 1980s,  and has since expanded to represent more than 490 firms from more than 70 countries. IIF members include commercial and investment banks, asset managers, insurance companies, sovereign wealth funds, hedge funds, central banks and development banks.

The IIF's mission is to support the financial industry in the prudent management of risks; to develop sound industry practices; and to advocate for regulatory, financial and economic policies that are in the broad interests of its members and foster global financial stability and sustainable economic growth.

The IIF serves its membership by:

 Providing analysis and research to its members on emerging markets and other issues in global finance.
 Developing and advancing views and proposals that influence the public debate on policies, including those of multilateral agencies, and on themes of common interest to participants in global financial markets.
 Coordinating a network for members to exchange views and offer opportunities for dialogue among policy-makers, regulators, and private sector financial institutions.

The Institute's Board of Directors  includes 43 leading CEOs and Chairs, led by Chairman Axel Weber; Vice Chairmen Brian Porter (also Treasurer of the IIF), Walter Kielholz, Piyush Gupta and Candido Bracher. The IIF's President and Chief Executive Officer is Timothy D. Adams, who has held the position since February 1, 2013. The Institute is headquartered in Washington, D.C., and has satellite offices in Beijing, Singapore, Dubai and Brussels.

Membership 

IIF members include commercial and investment banks, asset managers, insurance companies, sovereign wealth funds, hedge funds, central banks and development banks.

Former chairmen 

 William S. Ogden (Chairman of the formation committee and Interim Board, 1983)
 Richard D. Hill (1984–1986)
 Barry F. Sullivan (1986–1991)
 Antoine Jeancourt-Galignani (1991–1994)
 William R. Rhodes, Acting Chairman (April - October 1994)
 Toyoo Gyohten (1994–1997)
 Georges Blum (1997–1998)
 Sir John R.H. Bond (1998–2003)
 Josef Ackermann (2003–2012)
 Douglas Flint (2012-2016)
 Axel A. Weber (2016- )

References

External links 
 IIF Website
 List of members
 IIF press releases

Organizations established in 1983
Research institutes in the United States
Economic research institutes
International banking institutions
Finance industry associations
International business organizations